Qian Hong (died 271) was an official of the Jin dynasty of China. He previously served in the state of Cao Wei during the Three Kingdoms period. His father, Qian Zhao, was a notable military general of the Cao Wei state.

Life
Qian Hong was the second son of Qian Zhao, a military general of the Cao Wei state in the Three Kingdoms period. He initially served as the Administrator of Longxi Commandery (隴西郡; around present-day Longxi County, Gansu). In 263, he participated in the campaign against Wei's rival state, Shu Han, as a subordinate of the Wei general Deng Ai. After the fall of Shu, the Wei government appointed Qian Hong as the Administrator of Shu Commandery (蜀郡; around present-day Chengdu, Sichuan). Between 264 and 265, he was promoted to Army Protector Who Inspires Might.

In 265, following the replacement of the Cao Wei state by the Jin dynasty (266–420), Qian Hong was appointed as the Inspector of Yang Province. In 270, he repelled an invasion led by Ding Feng, a general from the Jin dynasty's rival state Eastern Wu. Around the time, Qian Hong had disagreements with his superior, Chen Qian, who was the overall supervisor of military affairs in Yang Province. Both Qian Hong and Chen Qian wrote reports to Emperor Wu to accuse each other of incompetence. Emperor Wu eventually reassigned Qian Hong to be the Inspector of Liang Province.

In 271, the Xianbei chieftain Tufa Shujineng started a rebellion in Beidi Commandery (北地郡; around present-day Tongchuan, Shaanxi) and led his tribal forces to attack Jincheng Commandery (金城郡; around present-day Yuzhong County, Gansu). Qian Hong, then the Inspector of Liang Province, led government forces to attack the rebels. However, due to his incompetence, he caused the Qiang tribes to rebel as well. He was eventually cornered by the rebels and killed in battle.

See also
 Lists of people of the Three Kingdoms

References

 Chen, Shou (3rd century). Records of the Three Kingdoms (Sanguozhi).
 Fang, Xuanling (ed.) (648). Book of Jin (Jin Shu).
 Pei, Songzhi (5th century). Annotations to Records of the Three Kingdoms (Sanguozhi zhu).

Year of birth unknown
271 deaths
Cao Wei generals
Jin dynasty (266–420) generals
Political office-holders in Gansu
Political office-holders in Sichuan
Political office-holders in Anhui
Cao Wei politicians
Three Kingdoms people killed in battle
Jin dynasty (266–420) politicians